Saladitos are plums or apricots, which are dried, salted and which can also be sweetened with sugar and anise or coated in chili and lime. A common misconception is that saladitos and chamoy are the same thing; saladitos are the dried salted fruit, whereas chamoy is made from the leftover brine.

Saladitos are considered a candy in Mexico. Sometimes used in the popular Michelada drink. For Mexicans and some Asians, one of the method of eating saladitos is to stuff a few of them into an orange or lemon and then suck the salted juice out, while allowing the saladito to rehydrate. Once all the juice is eaten, the saladitos are eaten and the pits can be cracked open to eat the seed. Another method is to eat the saladito without any fruit, and cracking open the pit to eat the seed or discard the pit. One can also first rinse the saladito with water, and then eat it plain.

On some occasions, to spice up drinks, a few saladitos are put inside drinks like Micheladas, Sprite, ginger ale or beer.  Once the saladito is placed in the soda, bubbles will begin to rise immediately. In Taiwan, a popular plum drink is made by soaking several saladitos in a pitcher of water until the plum rehydrates and flavors the water.

In Australia, Saladitos are known as Salty Plums and come in a variety of different textures, with some being more salty and some being sweeter. In the northern part of Australia, NT, WA and QLD they are very popular. Some of the main ingredients are salt, sugar, food colouring and plums.

In Trinidad, Tobago and in some english-speaking Caribbean islands, this treat is referred to as salted prunes.

Recall
A recall notice was issued in the United States in 2009 when saladitos believed to have been sourced from Asia were found to have levels of lead exceeding health guidelines.

See also

 Li hing mui
 List of dried foods
 Umeboshi

References 

Dried fruit
Mexican cuisine
Plum dishes